Karin-gorfood (Karin-garfood, Karin-karfood) is a town in the Sool region of Somaliland.

Education
According to the 2007 survey, Karin-gorfood has an integrated school with 90 students. However, this year was severely affected by the drought and the resulting displacement.

History
In June 2008, the International Committee of the Red Cross donated rice, oil, and cowpeas to a poor district in the Sool region including Karin-gorfood.

In September 2012, Minister of Education Puntland inspected the educational situation in Karin-gorfood and other cities.

In June 2014, Khatumo State forces led by Ali Khalif Galaydh rest their troops in Karin-gorfood on their way from Taleh to Sahdheer, pursued by Somaliland forces.

In November 2017, a measles epidemic broke out in the Bo'ame district, and the epidemic was particularly prolonged in Karin-gorfood due to a lack of vaccine and other factors.

In May 2020, a coordinator from the Somaliland Ministry of Health visited a number of towns in the Sool region, including Karin-gorfood.

In January 2021, a conference for peace was held in Karin-gorfood.

References

Cities in Somalia
Populated places in Sool, Somaliland